Musselwhite is a surname. Notable people with the surname include:
Charlie Musselwhite (born 1944), American musician
David Musselwhite (1940–2010), British literary critic
Harry W. Musselwhite (1868–1955), American politician
Paul Musselwhite (born 1968), English footballer